The 2010 U.S. congressional elections in Texas were held on November 2, 2010, to determine who will represent the state of Texas in the United States House of Representatives. Representatives are elected for two-year terms; those elected served in the 112th Congress from January 2011 until January 2013.

With 27% of the voting age public turning out, the Republican Party won 23 seats and the Democratic Party won 9 seats. Three house seats changed parties this election, with the 17th, 23rd, and 27th districts all flipping from Democratic to Republican seats.

Overview
Results of the 2010 United States House of Representatives elections in Texas by district:

District 1

Republican incumbent Louie Gohmert ran for reelection.

General election results

District 2

Republican incumbent Ted Poe ran for reelection.

General election results

District 3

Republican candidate Sam Johnson had been the incumbent since 1991. In 2010, Johnson faced Independent Emma Berry, Democrat John Lingenfelder and Libertarian Christopher J. Claytor.

General election results

District 4

Republican Ralph Hall, at the time the oldest living member of the House of Representatives, had represented the district since 1980. In 2008, Hall won re-election with 68.8%. In 2010, he won the primary with 57% of the vote, and faced a re-election campaign against Democrat attorney VaLinda Hathcox.

General election results

District 5

Republican Jeb Hensarling was first elected in 2002 to a heavily Republican district. A favorite among fiscal conservatives in Texas, Hensarling was considered a potential challenger for the U.S. Senate in 2012 when the incumbent Republican Kay Bailey Hutchison retired. In 2008, Hensarling was re-elected with 83.6% of the vote. In 2010, he went unopposed in the primary and faced Democrat activist Tom Berry in the general election.

General election results

District 6

Twelve-term Republican Joe Barton was the chair of the House Energy and Commerce Committee until Democrats took over the House in 2006. In 2008, Barton won re-election with 62.0%. He faced Democratic activist David Cozad in the general election.

General election results

District 7

Republican John Culberson was unopposed in the general election.

General election results

District 8

Republican Kevin Brady represented a strongly GOP district. He won re-election in 2008 with 72.6%. In 2010, he faced Libertarian Bruce West, a design engineer and 2-time Democratic congressional candidate Kent Hargett in the general election.

General election results

District 9

Democrat Al Green was re-elected with 94% in 2008. Republican activist Steve Mueller faced Green in the general election.

General election results

District 10

Republican Michael McCaul ran for reelection in 2010. He defeated Democratic nominee, war veteran Ted Ankrum in the general election.

General election results

District 11

Republican Mike Conaway represented George W. Bush’s strongest district in the 2004 election. He won 77% of the vote in 2004 and was one of only a handful of Republicans who ran unopposed in 2006. In 2008, he won re-election with 88.3%. In 2010, he faced Democrat activist James Quillian in the general election.

General election results

District 12

Republican Kay Granger won re-election in 2008 with 67.6%. In 2010, she won the primary with 70%, and faced Democrat activist Tracey Smith in the general election.

General election results

District 13

Republican Mac Thornberry ran for re-election.

General election results

District 14

Republican Ron Paul is best known for his strong libertarian views. In 2010, he won the primary with 80% of the vote. In the Democratic primary, Robert Pruett won the run off election with just 52% of the vote, and faced Paul in the general election.

General election results

Campaign finance report

District 15

Democrat Rubén Hinojosa was re-elected with 62% in 2004 and 66% in 2008. In 2010, the Republican primary had a run off between Eddie Zamora and Paul Haring. Zamora won the run off with 57% of the vote and faced Hinojosa in the general election.

General election results

District 16

Democrat Silvestre Reyes was the Chairman of the Permanent Select Committee on Intelligence. Reyes won re-election in 2008 with 82%. In 2010, he faced Republican navy veteran Tim Besco.

General election results

District 17

Democratic incumbent Chet Edwards was challenged by Republican nominee Bill Flores and Libertarian nominee Richard B. Kelly.

In 2008, Edwards was reelected with 53% to Republican small business owner Rob Curnock, who was overwhelmingly outspent. Edwards was a moderate Democrat, who represented one of the most conservative districts in the nation. In 2010, he went uncontested in the Democratic primary. In the Republican primary, Curnock qualified for a run off election against Flores. Flores won the run off with 64% of the vote. 

Endorsements

The Dallas Morning News and the Fort Worth Star-Telegram both endorsed Edwards prior to the 2010 general election.

Polling

General election results

Edwards's loss was the largest margin of defeat for an incumbent Democrat in the 2010 cycle.

District 18

Democrat Sheila Jackson Lee represented one of the most heavily Democratic areas in the state. In 2008, she won re-election with 77% of the vote against Republican John Faulk, who she again faced in 2010.

General election results

District 19

Republican Randy Neugebauer won re-election in 2006 with 68% and in 2008 with 72.5%. In 2010, he faced Democrat Andy Wilson and Libertarian Chip Peterson in the general election.

General election results

District 20

Democrat Joaquin Castro represented much of heavily Democratic, largely Hispanic inner San Antonio.

General election results

District 21

Longtime Republican Lamar S. Smith won re-election with 60% in 2006 and 80% in 2008. In 2010, he won the primary with 80% and faced Democratic real estate broker Lainey Melnick in the general election.

General election results

District 22

Freshman Pete Olson won the 2008 election with 53% in a heavily Republican district. In 2010, he faced Democrat Kesha Rogers, a LaRouche Movement supporter, and Libertarian Steve Susman, a small business owner in the general election.

General election results

District 23

Democratic incumbent Ciro Rodriguez was challenged by Republican nominee Quico Canseco, Libertarian nominee Martin Nitschke campaign site, Green Party nominee Ed Scharf campaign site, and Independent Craig T. Stephens campaign site.

In the 2010 Republican primary, Canseco won the run off election against former CIA officer Will Hurd with 56% of the vote. In the Democratic primary, Rodriguez won with 83% against Iraq war veteran Miguel Ortiz.

In 2008, Rodriguez was re-elected with 56% of the vote. Obama carried the district with 51% of the vote. The district is 55% Hispanic, but has a Republican tilt as George Bush carried the district by a 15% margin.

General election results

District 24

Republican Kenny Marchant faced write-in Democratic candidate Alex Dunaj in the general election.

General election results

District 25

Democrat Lloyd Doggett faced Republican physician Donna Campbell in the general election.

General election results

District 26

Republican Michael Burgess won re-election in 2008 with 60.2%. In 2010, he faced Democrat attorney Neil Durrance and Libertarian Mark Boler.  Except for the district's first election, the 26th District has been held by the GOP and is considered one of its safe seats.

General election results

District 27

Democratic incumbent Solomon Ortiz was challenged by Republican nominee attorney Blake Farenthold and Libertarian nominee Ed Mishou.

The Republican primary ended in a run off which Farenthold won with 51.3% against conservative activist James Duerr. Mishou, of Cameron County, was the 2010 Libertarian Party nominee and came in a close second to Farenthold in a 2010 27th District Tea Party poll.

Ortiz was re-elected in 2008 with 58% of the vote, although Barack Obama carried the district with just 53% of the vote. The district is nearly 70% Hispanic.

General election results

District 28

Democrat Henry Cuellar was re-elected in 2008 with 69% of the vote, but Barack Obama only carried the district with 56% of the vote. In 2010, he faced Republican businessman Bryan Underwood in the general election.

General election results

District 29

Democrat Gene Green won re-election with 75% in 2008. In 2010, he faced Republican air force veteran Roy Morales.

General election results

District 30

Incumbent Democratic nominee Eddie Bernice Johnson won re-election in 2008 with 83%. In the Republican primary Stephen Broden narrowly avoided a runoff in the first round, but he won the second round with 67.5% of the vote.

General election results

District 31

John Carter was opposed by Libertarian Bill Oliver in the general election.

General election results

District 32

Six-term incumbent Pete Sessions held a Republican-leaning district. In 2010, he faced Democrat Grier Raggio in the general election.

General election results

References

External links
Elections Division at the Texas Secretary of State
Official candidate lists
U.S. Congress Candidates for Texas at Project Vote Smart
Texas U.S. House from OurCampaigns.com
Campaign contributions for U.S. Congressional races in Texas from OpenSecrets
2010 Texas General Election graph of multiple polls from Pollster.com

House - Texas from the Cook Political Report

Texas
2010
United States House of Representatives